Boom (stylized as boom.) is the second studio album by American country pop singer Walker Hayes. The album, containing 10 songs, was released on December 8, 2017.

Background 
The release date was announced by Hayes label in the first week of September 2017. The album's lead single, "You Broke Up with Me", was released on June 26, 2017. Hayes spoke of the album, he said "'Boom!' It's my favorite word. It's what I text my team every time another station adds 'You Broke Up With Me'... It's the first thing I say after I play a song from the album for anyone... So, it's what we had to call the album."

Commercial performance
The album debuted at No. 6 on Billboards Top Country Albums, with 12,300 copies sold. It has sold 32,600 copies in the United States as of May 2018.

Track listing 
Track listing adapted from Megacountry

Personnel
Adapted from AllMusic

Dave Cohen - Hammond B-3 organ, keyboards, synthesizer
Kris Donegan - acoustic guitar, electric guitar
Fred Eltringham - drums, drum loops, percussion
Paul Franklin - pedal steel guitar
Nicolle Galyon - duet vocals on "Halloween"
Ryan Gore - percussion, drum programming
Walker Hayes - beat box, clapping, acoustic guitar, electric guitar, keyboards, drum loops, percussion, drum programming, synthesizer, synthesizer bass, lead vocals, background vocals, whistle
Lee Hendricks - bass guitar
Tony Lucido - bass guitar
Matt McGinn - background vocals
Justin Niebank - keyboards, drum programming
Derek Wells - electric guitar

Charts

Weekly charts

Year-end charts

References

2017 albums
Monument Records albums
Walker Hayes albums
Albums produced by Shane McAnally